Alice  Pearl Daiguma Eather (1988/1989 – 4 June 2017) was an Aboriginal Australian slam poet, environmental campaigner and teacher from Maningrida. In 2013 Eather started Protect Arnhem Land, an anti-fracking campaign group against Paltar Petroleum. The group was successful in convincing the Northern Territory government to suspend the application pending agreement with the local population; further campaigning eventually led to Paltar withdrawing the application in 2016. In 2014 she was awarded the Northern Territory Young Achiever's Environment Award for her work in preventing oil exploration of Arnhem Land. Eather contributed poetry to the anthology Growing Up Aboriginal In Australia (2018). She appeared in the ABC television programme The Word: Rise of the Slam Poets.

Eather was born in Brisbane to Helen Djimbarrwala Willams and Michael Eather, an artist and gallery-owner with European ancestors who arrived on the Second Fleet. She was raised and educated in Brisbane but moved to Maningrida to become the first Ndjebbana-speaking Aboriginal teacher. She died at age 28 as a result of suicide.

References

2017 suicides
Indigenous Australian people
Slam poets
Writers from Brisbane
Australian environmentalists
Australian women poets
Year of birth uncertain
Suicides in Australia